The 2021–22 Arkansas State Red Wolves men's basketball team represented Arkansas State University in the 2021–22 NCAA Division I men's basketball season. The Red Wolves, led by fifth-year head coach Mike Balado, played their home games at the First National Bank Arena in Jonesboro, Arkansas as members of the Sun Belt Conference. They finished the season 18–11, 8–7 in Sun Belt play to finish in sixth place. They defeated Louisiana–Monroe in the first round of the Sun Belt tournament before losing to Georgia State in the quarterfinals.

Previous season
In a season limited due to the ongoing COVID-19 pandemic, the Red Wolves finished the 2020–21 season 11–13, 7–8 in Sun Belt play to finish in fourth place in the West Division. In the first round of the Sun Belt tournament, they defeated Georgia Southern, before falling to Georgia State in the quarterfinals.

Roster

Schedule and results

|-
!colspan=12 style=| Exhibition

|-
!colspan=12 style=| Non-conference regular season

|-
!colspan=9 style=| Sun Belt Conference regular season

|-
!colspan=12 style=| Sun Belt tournament

Source

References

Arkansas State Red Wolves men's basketball seasons
Arkansas State
Arkansas State Red Wolves men's basketball
Arkansas State Red Wolves men's basketball